Odyssey Software provided mobile device management and software development tools to enterprise companies either directly (primarily through its Athena product) or through partner solutions. This technology allowed companies to manage multiple mobile operating systems at a detailed level, including functions such as inventory collection, software management, remote control, and device configuration.

History 
Odyssey Software was founded in 1996 by Mark Gentile and originally focused on building software development tools. However, it was focused on developing software products that enable developers to architect, build, deploy, and manage enterprise applications for managing mobile and embedded devices as well as mobile device management.  The company was sold to NortonLifeLock (formerly known as Symantec) in a deal completed on March 2, 2012.

Products 
 Athena : device management software that extends Microsoft System Center solutions, adding the ability to manage, support, and control mobile and embedded devices, such as smartphones and ruggedized handhelds.
 AppCenter : an application manager that restricts end-user activity to a set of “authorized only” applications, preventing non-productive or unauthorized device utilization.
 ViaXML : a mobile and wireless application infrastructure that enables web services (which provide access to data, business logic, knowledge, and application components) to be exposed and called over the Internet and corporate intranet using open Internet standards – XML, HTTP and HTTPS.
 CEfusion : a set of mobile and wireless application data access infrastructure for rapidly building and deploying rich mobile enterprise applications. It extends the core Windows DNA data access technologies — ADO (ActiveX Data Objects), MTS (Microsoft Transaction Services), and MSMQ (Microsoft Message Queuing) — to the mobile application environment.

References 

Mobile device management
Mobile software programming tools